Sońsk  is a village in Ciechanów County, Masovian Voivodeship, in east-central Poland. It is the seat of the gmina (administrative district) called Gmina Sońsk.

The village has a population of 881.

References

Villages in Ciechanów County